Orlando Nadres (November 1938, in Tayabas, Quezon – July 14, 1991) was a stage, film, television writer, director and actor.

He is the son of Igmideo Nadres and Tecla Reobaldo. He attended the Lucena and Tayabas Elementary School, then went to Luis Palad High School where he published his first story in Liwayway. He spent four years in Our Lady of Guadalupe Seminary and a year in the St. Paul Seminary in Pasay. He took a secretarial course and enrolled in Journalism and later in Foreign Service, major in French in U.S.T.

As a writer
Nadres first wrote professionally for Komiks, together with Mars Ravalo doing layouts and writing stories for the publication and in 1968 became the managing editor of the same publication. In the 1960s, he  worked for G. Miranda and Sons Publishing Co. which later inspired him to write Paraisong Parisukat. Later he became the editor of “Sixteen Magazine” the job which introduced him to the world of Film. He became involved in theater because of his involvement with the infamous Lino Brocka, who introduced him to PETA.

After Martial Law was declared, he helped sustain PETA, as an actor, playwright and Trainer in CITASA.

In the late 1980s, when he decided to stay in his hometown Tayabas, Nadres formed the theater group SUSI (Sanayan at Ugnayan sa Sining), which revived the traditional performances of Carillo, Santacruzan and Sarswela.

His Works

Films
Stardoom (1970)
Happy Hippie Holiday (1971)
Villa Miranda (1972) 
Till Death Do Us Part (1973)
Ang Tatay Kong Nanay (1978) 
Immortal (1989) 
Bakit Kay Tagal ng Sandali (1992) 
Una Kang Naging Akin (1991)

Film appearances
Tinimbang Ka Ngunit Kulang (1974) 
Maynila sa Mga Kuko ng Liwanag (1977) 
Tahan Na Empoy Tahan Na (1977)

Films directed
Nora, Mahal Kita (1972) 
Lupang Hinirang (1973) 
Pahiram ng Pag-ibig (1975) 
Malamig Miinit ang Magdamag (1976)
Gisingin Mo ang Umaga (1976)

For television
Balintataw (1970–72; 1988)
Hilda (1972) 
Babae (1974) 
Atin ang Daigdig (1974) 
Tanghalan (1975)
Lino Brocka Presents (1977)
Flordeluna (1979)

Teleplay appearances
Mang Nano (1975) 
Alindog (1977)

Awards

References

External links

1938 births
1991 deaths
Artists from Quezon
Filipino film directors
Male actors from Quezon
People from Tayabas
Writers from Quezon